Leda Luss Luyken, née Valata, (born 1952 in Athens), Greece, is a Greek/American conceptual artist, who lives and works in Germany.

Biography 

Leda Luss-Luyken was educated at the Ecole d'Humanité in Switzerland and studied arts and architecture in Zurich, New York and Manchester. During that time she was particularly influenced by the works of Frank Lloyd Wright, Mies van der Rohe and Richard Neutra as well as Japanese garden architecture. 

She then began her professional career as an architectural designer and interior architect in New York, working intensively with designs by Charles Eames, Herman Miller and Eero Saarinen. 

Drawing on this experience, Leda Luss Luyken has been working since 1983 as a conceptual artist in England, Germany and Greece. She received painting tutorials from Alfred de Vivanco, a pupil of Emil Nolde and is regularly being coached by Gisela Sellenriek (Academy of Fine Arts Berlin and Munich).

Works

Figurative works 1985 to 1996

This is a body of work ranging from life drawing to expressive figurative paintings depicting personifications of the condition humaine. They were shown in two major solo shows in Amsterdam  and are documented in a monograph.

ModulArt 1996 to date

ModulArt is Leda Luss Luyken's conceptual innovation, a "new way of motion in painting" (Denys Zacharopoulos). Luss Luyken has produced cycles of paintings using this innovative technique: Millennium (1996–2002); Greek Spirit (2003–2005); Genesis (2006–2008); 96% Dark Matter (2008–2010); Cosmos Sensual (2010–2011). Each of these cycles comprises approximately 20 large scale paintings measuring 180 : 180 cm or more. 

In terms of contemporary art, ModulArt belongs to the category of conceptual art. It is not so much the finished painting but its openness to change and alterability that define the basic idea of ModulArt. The painter's sujets are open to their de- and reconstruction into new, modulated images. To do so, the artist lets go of her work and allows for its further development by the viewer. The viewer thus becomes an active user of art. Modulated images open up new perspectives and insights on the subject, the artistic development of a piece of art remains in a state of flux. Such further development of a ModulArt painting is open-source and can be done any time in nearly unlimited variations. Luss Luyken's ModulArt coincides and was developed independently during the same period of time with Stefano Vagnini's ModulArt in the realm of musical composition. Both hold that the artist’s tools to creativity are virtually unlimited by way of ModulArt.

Luss-Luyken's ModulArt was publicly exhibited in museums in Leipzig, Munich, Berlin and Weimar as well as in major solo shows in galleries in Amsterdam, Berlin, Zurich and Munich. Luss Luyken's ModulArt is documented in a catalogue, a monograph, a collector's catalogue  and three films.

RiceArt 2001 to date

RiceArt is multimedia work on transparent rice paper. Using this medium, Leda Luss Luyken has produced the following series of paintings: The Aphrodite Series (2001); The Nike Series (2003); The Garden of Eden Series (2004); The E-motions Series (2005).
			
Each of these consists of between 20 and 30 works, mostly on Indian or Chinese rice paper and in some cases using a combination on both. Many of the themes are drawn from ancient mythology and Luss Luyken transposes their essence into modernity.

Museum exhibitions 

1996		Museum Grassi in Leipzig | solo exhibition | Palympsistos |
2001		Haus der Kunst | München (K 01) |
2003		Abgusssammlung Antiker Plastik | Berlin | solo exhibition | 4Olympia04 |
2004		Haus der Kunst | München (K 04) |
2008		Stadtmuseum in Weimar | solo exhibition | Greek Spirit |
2012               Cultural Centre of Apollonia Milou | solo exhibition | A Voluntary Love |

Works in the public domain 
1985                   1000 Jahre Verden | glass mural | stained glass | 10 : 2.50 meters
1988                   Links | The European Institute for the Media | Manchester (UK) | 480 : 180 cm
1999                   Links | 480 : 2180 cm | Landesanstalt für Medien | Düsseldorf | Germany
2002                   Aphroditi | United Buddy Bear contracted by the Embassy of the Hellenic Republic, Berlin and sponsored by Honorary Consul Mme. Madeleine Schickedanz | exhibited at the Brandenburger Tor in Berlin and auctioned for the benefit of UNICEF
2003                   Olympic Ambassador | Buddy Bear for the Hellenic Republic, publicly shown in 2003 Berlin | 2003 Kitzbühel (AU) | 2004 Hong Kong | 2004 Istanbul | 2005 Tokyo | 2005 Seoul | 2005 Sydney  | 2006 Berlin | 2006 Vienna | 2007 Cairo | 2007 Jerusalem | 2008 Warsaw | 2008 Stuttgart | 2008  Pong Yang | 2009 Buenos Aires  | 2009 Montevideo | 2009 Berlin  | 2010 Astana | 2010 Helsinki |2011 Sofia |2012 New Delhi |2013 Paris |2014 Rio de Janeiro |2015 Havana
 2004/05            Gelber Engel |sculpture 63 : 99 : 85 cm  | commissioned by ADAC Germany | on public display at ADAC Cologne |
 2010          2K1| a contemporary DanceModulartVideo project | Kunsthalle whiteBOX Kultfabrik | Munich |

Major solo gallery shows 

1969		Stöckli Ausstellung, Ecole d'Humanité, Goldern, Switzerland
1987		5th Annual Exhibition of Young Artists, Cavendish House, Manchester, U.K.
1990		My Gender: a Woman Paints Women, Casabella Gallery, Manchester, U.K.
1992		Always at Midnight, Gallery Brouwersgracht Twee Drie Acht, Amsterdam, The Netherlands
1994		De koning en zijn hofhouding, Gallery Brouwersgracht Twee Drie Acht, Amsterdam, The Netherlands
1994		Right or Wrong, my Love, Galerie Belarte, Dübendorf, ZH, Switzerland
1998		Farbige und Weiße, Kunstpavillion Munich, Germany
1999		Perhaps Love, Gallerie Brouwersgracht Twee Drie Acht, Amsterdam, The Netherlands
2001		Die Sünde, HYPOSWISS, Zurich, Switzerland
2002		Six-pack, Galerie Browersgracht Twe Drie Acht, Amsterdam, The Netherlands
2004		Overzichtstentoonstelling 1991–2004, Gallery Twee Drie Acht, Amsterdam, The Netherlands
2006		Greek Spirit: e-motion, camera artis, Schauplatz für moderne Kunst, Munich, Germany
2008		Genesis, Camera artis, Schauplatz für moderne Kunst, Munich, Germany
2008		RiceArt, Galerie Refugium, Dresden, Germany
2009		:ModulArt = 4^y x y!, Marstall, Berg, Germany
2010		ModulArt: Freude an Innovation, BMW - SM, Munich | Germany
2010		|local > global | P1 | arts space | Melos | Greece
2011               Cosmos Sensual, ars24, Munich, Germany

Art trade fair shows 

 2011 | Ai15 | ART INNSBRUCK | Austria |
 2011 | und#6 | Karlsruhe | Germany |
 2011 | art Athina | Greece |
 2012 | Ai16 | ART INNSBRUCK | Austria |

Bibliography 
Breaking the Rules | Die Regeln brechen, ed by Tom Prader, English and German | 127 pp. | 84 color prints, Zurich | 1997
TryDax, Designed and edited by Klaus Walterspiel, 19 pp. with numerous color prints | Munich | 2000
Leda Luss Luyken :ModulArt, ed. by Georg von Kap-herr | English and German | 112 pp. with 60 color prints | Bobingen | 2008 |
 Wanderjahre, Arbeiten aus der Sammlung Kaske 1970-2010, ed by Anna Wondrak, Munich, 2011 |

Films 
Παντα ρει: Leda Luss-Luyken's ModulArt | Film + TV feature | 12’ | by 3’30” films |Berlin | 2004 |
:ModulArt©LLL, 1’30” | by Roman Luyken | Studio L | London | 2009 |
Leda Luss Luyken: ModulArt | TV Feature by Peider Defilla | for BRα - ARD TV | Munich | 15' | 2011 |

Memberships
Kulturverein Berg | Germany
Kunstverein München k.m | Munich | Germany

External links 

 LLLarts
 Saatchi Gallery
 Art Report

References

1952 births
Living people
Greek emigrants to Germany
Artists from Athens
Ecole d'Humanité alumni